James Sibenge (born 10 June 1966) is a Zimbabwean judoka. He competed in the men's lightweight event at the 1988 Summer Olympics.

References

1966 births
Living people
Zimbabwean male judoka
Olympic judoka of Zimbabwe
Judoka at the 1988 Summer Olympics
Place of birth missing (living people)
African Games medalists in judo
Competitors at the 1991 All-Africa Games
African Games bronze medalists for Zimbabwe